The 1941 Arizona State Bulldogs football team was an American football team that represented Arizona State Teachers College (later renamed Arizona State University) in the Border Conference during the 1941 college football season. In their fourth and final season under head coach Dixie Howell, the Bulldogs compiled a 5–5–1 record (2–4–1 against Border opponents) and were outscored by their opponents by a combined total of 137 to 111.

Center Ray Green was selected by the conference coaches as a first-team player on the 1941 All-Border Conference football team.

Schedule

References

Arizona State
Arizona State Sun Devils football seasons
Arizona State Sun Devils football